Herbert Barnes (1833–1890) was Archdeacon of Barnstaple.

Herbert Barnes may also refer to:

Herbert Barnes, character in The White Shadow (film)
Herbert Curie Barnes, served as Private Secretary to the Chief Commissioner of Burma, brother of Hugh Shakespear Barnes

See also
Bert Barnes (disambiguation)